Ľuboš Bernáth (born 8 November 1977 in Nové Zámky) is a Slovak composer and music educator.

Educated at the conservatory in Bratislava from 1996 to 2001, he subsequently studied with the composer Evgeni Irshai. Since 2008-09 he has been a teacher at the Bratislava Conservatory and at the Academy of Performing Arts in Bratislava (VŠMU). His compositions include choral and chamber music, as well as two symphonies.

External links
Ľuboš Bernáth – Allegro giocoso for piano and 2 bongos (2021) played by Jordana Palovičová (YouTube)

References

People from Nové Zámky
Slovak composers
Male composers
20th-century composers
21st-century composers
1977 births
Living people
Academic staff of the Academy of Performing Arts in Bratislava
Slovak male musicians